The Brotherhoods of Mallorca (Catalan: Germanies de Mallorca) was a revolt against the urban middle-class and the high nobility, in part influenced by the Revolt of the Brotherhoods in the Kingdom of Valencia, which occurred in 1521 as a consequence of the imprisonment of seven artisans.

As in Valencia, the Brotherhood was run by a board of thirteen people (Junta dels Tretze).  They seized the capital of Palma de Mallorca and dismissed the governor-general Miguel de Gurrea, who fled to Eivissa.  The nobles who survived the massacre in Bellver Castle took refuge in Alcudia, the only population remaining loyal to the king during the year and a half that the Brotherhoods dominated the island.  In August 1522, the emperor Charles V of Germany sent 800 men to help Gurrea, who moved to Alcudia to join with the nobles in the retaking of the island.  In December, they besieged the capital, and on 8 March 1523 the Brotherhoods surrendered Palma under the mediation of the bishop.  Despite the bishop's involvement in the surrender, over 200 Brothers were executed, and many fled to Catalonia.

References

Revolt of the Brotherhoods
History of Mallorca
History of the Balearic Islands
16th-century rebellions
16th century in Spain